Achan, the son of Carmi, a descendant of Zimri, the son of Zerah, of the tribe of Judah, is a figure who appears in the Book of Joshua in the Hebrew Bible in connection with the fall of Jericho and conquest of Ai.

Account in the Book of Joshua
According to the narrative of Joshua chapter 7, Achan pillaged an ingot of gold, a quantity of silver, and a "beautiful Babylonian garment" from Jericho, in contravention of Joshua's directive that "all the silver, and gold, and vessels of brass and iron, are consecrated unto the Lord: they shall come into the treasury of the Lord".

The Book of Joshua claims that this act resulted in the Israelites being collectively punished by God, in that they failed in their first attempt to capture Ai, with about 36 Israelites lost. The Israelites used cleromancy (the sacred Lots Urim and Thummim) to decide who was to blame, and having identified Achan, they sacrificed him to Yaweh as well as his sheep, other livestock and his children to death. Their remains were burnt by the Israelites, according to the text, and stones piled on top. Yahweh was pleased by this and his anger eased.

Interpretation
The narrative states that the location for this punishment of Achan, which lies between Jericho and Ai, became known as the vale of Achor in memory of him. This narrative is probably an etiological myth providing a folk etymology for Achor, at the point in the narrative where the vale of Achor is necessarily crossed.

One item to note however is that the text describes the garment that Achor stole as Babylonish; (from Shinar) the time of the Israelite invasion is usually dated to the 15th or 12th century BC, but between 1595 BCE and 627 BCE Babylon was under foreign rule. For this reason, a few textual scholars believe that this part of the Achor narrative was written during the 7th century BC or later, but many Biblical scholars believe the judge Samuel may have put together this account from historical books from that time. 

It is not certain, however, that the whole Achor narrative dates from this time, as textual critics believe that the Achor narrative may have been spliced together from two earlier source texts; the words in the first part of Joshua 7:25, "all Israel stoned him with stones" (וירגמו אתו) show a different style and tradition from those at the end of the verse: "and they burned them in fire, and they stoned them with stones" (וישרפו אתם באש ויסקלו אתם באבנים). The repetition, the switching from "him" to "them", and switching of the Hebrew verb for "to stone", indicate that this story may be an amalgam from two different sources.

Rabbinic
The Jewish exegetes, Rashi, Gersonides, and others, maintain that the stoning (Josh. vii. 25) was inflicted only on the beasts, and that the sons and daughters were brought there merely to witness and be warned. This seems to be the opinion also of the rabbis in the Talmud (see Rashi on Sanh. 44a), although they say that the wife and the children were accessories to the crime, in so far as they knew of it and kept silent. According to another and apparently much older rabbinical tradition, Achan's crime had many aggravating features. He had seen in Jericho an idol endowed with magic powers, with a tongue of gold, the costly mantle spread upon it, the silver presents before it. By taking this idol he caused the death, before the city of Ai, of thirty-six righteous men of Israel, members of the high court. When Joshua, through the twelve precious stones of the high priest's breastplate, learned who was the culprit, he resorted to the severest measures of punishment, inflicting death by stoning and by fire both on him and his children, in spite of Deut. xxiv. 16; for these had known of the crime and had not at once told the chiefs of the hidden idol. They thus brought death upon more than half the members of the high court (see Pirḳe R. El. xxxviii.; Tan., Wa-yesheb, ed. 1863, p. 43). Another view expressed by the rabbis is that Achan committed incest, or violatedthe Sabbath, or was otherwise guilty of a five-fold crime. This view is based upon the fivefold use of the word  ("also," "even") in Josh. vii. 11 ("They have also transgressed my covenant," etc.), as well as upon his own confession: "Thus and thus have I done" (Josh. vii. 20). Achan is held up by the rabbis as a model of the penitent sinner; because his public confession and subsequent punishment saved him from eternal doom in Gehenna. "Every culprit before he is to meet his penalty of death," says the Mishnah Sanh. vi. 2, "is told to make a public confession, in order to be saved from Gehenna's doom." Thus Achan confessed to all his sins when he said: "Of a truth I have sinned against the Lord, the God of Israel, and thus and thus I have done." That his avowal saved him from eternal doom may be learned from Joshua's words to Achan: "Why hast thou troubled us? So may the Lord trouble you this day," which are taken to mean "in the life that now is, so that thou mayest be released in the life to come" (Sanh. 43b-44; see also Ḳimḥi on Josh. v. 25).'

Family tree

Notes

References

Hebrew Bible people
People executed by stoning
Book of Joshua
Tribe of Judah